Joakim Grönhagen (born 25 October 1972) is a Swedish professional golfer who played on the Challenge Tour and European Tour.

Career
Grönhagen became the first Swede to win the Challenge Tour Rankings in 1993, ahead of Henrik Stenson (2000) and Johan Edfors (2003). He played 121 tournaments on the Challenge Tour 1992–2001, amassing four wins and four runner-up finishes. In 1992, he was runner-up at the Siab Open, then in 1993 he won the Challenge Tour rankings after winning three tournaments (Club Med Open, Bank Austria Open, Challenge Novotel) and finishing runner-up at Corfin Charity Challenge. In 1994, he narrowly missed out on two victories, losing the Swedish Matchplay Championship final to Per Nyman 1 up, and losing a playoff at the Volvo Finnish Open to Mikael Piltz.

Grönhagen played on the 1995 European Tour with best finish T25 at Volvo Scandinavian Masters, ending up 138th in the season rankings.

After retiring from tour, Grönhagen became a golf instructor, coaching Simon Forsström and HRH Prince Daniel, Duke of Västergötland.

Professional wins (6)

Challenge Tour wins (4)

Nordic Golf League wins (2)

Source:

See also
List of golfers with most Challenge Tour wins

References

External links

Swedish male golfers
European Tour golfers
Golfers from Stockholm
1972 births
Living people